This article displays the rosters for the participating teams at the 2001 FIBA Africa Championship.

|}
| valign="top" |
 Head coach

 Assistant coach

Legend
 (C) Team captain
 Club field describes current club
|}

|}
| valign="top" |
 Head coach

 Assistant coach

Legend
 (C) Team captain
 Club field describes current club
|}

|}
| valign="top" |
 Head coach

 Assistant coach

Legend
 (C) Team captain
 Club field describes current club
|}

|}
| valign="top" |
 Head coach

 Assistant coach

Legend
 (C) Team captain
 Club field describes current club
|}

|}
| valign="top" |
 Head coach

 Assistant coach

Legend
 (C) Team captain
 Club field describes current club
|}

|}
| valign="top" |
 Head coach

 Assistant coach

Legend
 (C) Team captain
 Club field describes current club
|}

|}
| valign="top" |
 Head coach

 Assistant coach

Legend
 (C) Team captain
 Club field describes current club
|}

|}
| valign="top" |
 Head coach

 Assistant coach

Legend
 (C) Team captain
 Club field describes current club
|}

|}
| valign="top" |
 Head coach

 Assistant coach

Legend
 (C) Team captain
 Club field describes current club
|}

|}
| valign="top" |
 Head coach

 Assistant coach

Legend
 (C) Team captain
 Club field describes current club
|}

|}
| valign="top" |
 Head coach

 Assistant coach

Legend
 (C) Team captain
 Club field describes current club
|}

|}
| valign="top" |
 Head coach

 Assistant coach

Legend
 (C) Team captain
 Club field describes current club
|}

See also
 2000 FIBA Africa Clubs Champions Cup squads

References

AfroBasket squads
squads